Lectionary 209, designated by siglum ℓ 209 (in the Gregory-Aland numbering) is a Greek manuscript of the New Testament, on parchment. Palaeographically it has been assigned to the 12th century. 
Scrivener labelled it by 216evl.
The manuscript is lacunose.

Description 

The codex contains lessons from the Gospels of John, Matthew, Luke lectionary (Evangelistarium), on 217 parchment leaves, with some lacunae at the beginning and end.
The text is written in Greek minuscule letters, in 21 quires, in two columns per page, 21 lines per page (and more lines). It contains musical notes.

There are daily lessons from Easter to Pentecost.

History 

Scrivener dated the manuscript to the 13th century, Gregory dated it to the 12th century. It has been assigned by the INTF to the 12th century.

The manuscript was added to the list of New Testament manuscripts by Scrivener (number 216) and Gregory (number 209). Gregory saw it in 1883.

The manuscript is not cited in the critical editions of the Greek New Testament (UBS3).

The codex is located in the Bodleian Library (Wake 16) at Oxford.

See also 

 List of New Testament lectionaries
 Biblical manuscript
 Textual criticism

Notes and references

Bibliography 

 

Greek New Testament lectionaries
12th-century biblical manuscripts
Bodleian Library collection